Chabaud may refer to:

People
Alain Chabaud (1923-2013), French parasitologist.
Auguste Chabaud (1882-1955), French painter and sculptor.
Jaime Chabaud (born 1966), Mexican playwright.
Louis-Félix Chabaud (1824-1902), French sculptor and medallist.
Sébastien Chabaud (born 1977), French football player.